Anaxyrina is a genus of moths in the family Lecithoceridae.

Species
 Anaxyrina albicostalis Park, 2008
 Anaxyrina cyanopa Meyrick, 1918

References

Natural History Museum Lepidoptera genus database

Torodorinae
Moth genera
Taxa named by Edward Meyrick